The Law of Men (French: La loi des hommes) is a 1962 French crime film directed by Charles Gérard and starring Micheline Presle, Philippe Leroy and Pierre Mondy. After a planned robbery on an armoured car the investigating police officer encounters a female journalist who specialises in criminology, and who he suspects may have had a role in the heist.

Cast

References

Bibliography 
 Anne Commire & Deborah Klezmer. Women in World History: A Biographical Encyclopedia, Volume 1. Yorkin Publications, 1999.

External links 
 

1962 films
1962 crime films
French crime films
French black-and-white films
1960s French-language films
Films directed by Charles Gérard
1960s French films